José "Pepe" Imaz Ruiz (born 30 May 1974 in Arnedo) is a tennis coach and former professional tennis player from Spain.

Playing career
Imaz made his debut on the ATP Tour at the 1995 Austrian Open. He lost to Sergi Bruguera in the second round, having earlier beaten Christian Miniussi.

His most noteworthy performance came in the 1998 French Open, the only Grand Slam of his career. The Spaniard had a five set opening round win over Jean-Baptiste Perlant. He then lost in straight sets to eventual champion Carlos Moyá, but would come close to winning the second set tiebreak, which lasted for 30 points, and in which he blew several set points.

Coaching career
Imaz's tennis school is based at Marbella's Puente Romano resort. The school preaches a philosophy of Amor y Paz (Love and Peace) as the overriding factors when coaching tennis, in which he uses meditation and the power of lengthy hugs. In 2013, then professional tennis player Marko Djokovic used Imaz's methodologies to help alleviate symptoms of his depression. In 2016, post-Novak Djokovic's win at the French Open, Imaz became part of Novak's support team from Wimbledon onwards. In April 2018, Djokovic stopped working with him, and also announced the end of his "cooperation" with Radek Štěpánek and Andre Agassi. As of August 2018, Djokovic and Imaz were close friends.

ATP Challenger Tour finals

Doubles: (2-3)

References

External links
 
 

1974 births
Living people
Spanish male tennis players
Sportspeople from Logroño